The Canadian Institute of Geomatics (CIG, French: Association canadienne des sciences géomatiques) is a not-for-profit scientific association based in Ottawa, Ontario devoted to the development of geomatics in Canada. It was previously known as "Canadian Institute of Surveying and Mapping" and the "Association canadienne des sciences géodésiques et cartographiques".

Founded in 1882, the Canadian Institute of Geomatics evolved into be a non-profit scientific and technical association that represents the largest and most influential geospatial community in Canada. The Canadian Institute of Geomatics are one of the founding members of Canadian GeoAlliance, an umbrella organization started to help address sector-wide strategic priorities in the geomatics sector.

CIG sponsors the academic journal Geomatica, published by Canadian Science Publishing.

See also
American Congress on Surveying and Mapping
International Federation of Surveyors

References

External links
 Canadian Institute of Geomatics

Scientific organizations based in Canada
Geographic data and information organizations
Geomatics organizations
Surveying of Canada